Martin Frey (7 December 1904 – 5 November 1971) was a German politician of the Christian Democratic Union (CDU) and former member of the German Bundestag.

Life 
Frey was first elected to the German Bundestag in 1949. In the constituency of Geldern-Kleve, he received 60.0% of the valid votes cast and thus entered parliament as a directly elected member. He was not a direct candidate in the next Bundestag election in 1953 and was not elected via the state list. From 1957 to 1969 he was again a member of the Bundestag, where he now always entered via his party's North Rhine-Westphalian state list.

Literature

References

1904 births
1971 deaths
Members of the Bundestag for North Rhine-Westphalia
Members of the Bundestag 1965–1969
Members of the Bundestag 1961–1965
Members of the Bundestag 1957–1961
Members of the Bundestag 1949–1953
Members of the Bundestag for the Christian Democratic Union of Germany